Sky Full of Thunder is a novel by F. J. Thwaites.

References

External links
Sky Full of Thunder at AustLit

1968 Australian novels